Charles Sears Baldwin (21 March 1867 – 23 October 1935) was an American scholar and professor of rhetoric at Yale University. Born in New York City in 1867, Baldwin entered Columbia College at seventeen and received his A.B. in 1888. He was one of the earliest students to be granted the Ph.D. degree in English at Columbia. Besides teaching at Yale (1895–1911), Baldwin also worked at Barnard College and Columbia University. He was married twice, first in 1894 to Agnes Irwin (who died in 1897), and then to Gratia Eaton Whited in 1902. Most of his life an Episcopalian, he converted to Catholicism the year before his death. Baldwin died in New York City in 1935.

Works
 The Inflections and Syntax of the Morte D'Arthur of Sir Thomas Malory (1894).
 Specimens of Prose Description (1895).
 The Expository Paragraph and Sentence (1897).
 A College Manual of Rhetoric (1902).
 American Short Stories (1904).
 How to Write (1905; reprinted as The English Bible as a Guide to Writing).
 Essays Out of Hours (1907).
 Writing and Speaking (1909).
 Composition, Oral and Written (1909).
 An Introduction to English Medieval Literature (1914).
 God Unknown (1920).
 Ancient Rhetoric and Poetic (1924).
 Medieval Rhetoric and Poetic (1928).
 Three Medieval Centuries of Literature in England, 1100-1400 (1932).
 Renaissance Literary Theory and Practice (1939).

Other
 Introduction and notes to Thomas De Quincey's Revolt of the Tartars. New York: Longmans, Green & Co., 1896.
 Introduction and notes to John Bunyan's The Pilgrim's Progress. New York: Longmans, Green & Co., 1905.
 Preface to Thomas De Quincey's Joan of Arc and the English Mail-coach. New York: Longmans, Green & Co., 1906.
 "Master Vergil," The Classical Weekly 2 (5), 1908, pp. 36–37.
 Introduction to Aristotle's Poetics; Longinus on the Sublime. New York: The Macmillan Company, 1930.
 "St. Augustine on Preaching." In: The Rhetoric of St. Augustine of Hippo. Ed. Richard Leo Enos and Roger Thompson, et al. Baylor University Press, 2008, pp. 187–203.

References

Further reading
 Crowley, Sharon (1998). "Literature in Composition, 1900–1930." In: Composition in the University: Historical and Polemical Essays. University of Pittsburgh Press, pp. 97–103.

External links

 
 Works by Charles Sears Baldwin, at Hathi Trust

American classical scholars
Educators from New York City
Columbia College (New York) alumni
1867 births
1935 deaths
Classical scholars of Columbia University
Classical scholars of Yale University
American rhetoricians